This is a complete list of vice admirals in the United States Public Health Service Commissioned Corps. The rank of vice admiral (or three-star admiral), ranks above rear admiral (two-star admiral) and below admiral (full admiral, or four-star admiral) in the U.S. Public Health Service Commissioned Corps. 

There have been 12 vice admirals in the history of the U.S. Public Health Service Commissioned Corps. Of these, 9 achieved that rank while on active duty and 3 were promoted upon retirement in recognition of meritorious service. All 12 were directly commissioned into the regular corps, with 10 commissioned into the U.S. Public Health Service Commissioned Corps (direct) and 2 commissioned into its predecessor, the Marine Hospital Service (MHS). 8 were originally civilians who were appointed to the regular corps and to grade upon taking office, 3 were active duty officers appointed to grade after leaving office, and one was a civilian appointed to the regular corps at four-star rank upon initial assumption of office.

List of admirals

All admirals in this list are indexed by the numerical order in which each officer was promoted to that rank, or by an asterisk (*) if the officer did not serve in that rank while on active duty in the U.S. Public Health Service Commissioned Corps or was promoted to four-star rank while on active duty in the U.S. Public Health Service Commissioned Corps. The date listed is that of the officer's first promotion to vice admiral, and may differ from the officer's entry in the U.S. Public Health Service register. The year commissioned is taken to be the year the officer was directly commissioned which may precede the officer's actual date of commission by up to two years. Each entry lists the admiral's name, date of rank, active-duty position held while serving at three-star rank, number of years of active-duty service at three-star rank (Yrs), year commissioned and source of commission, number of years in commission when promoted to three-star rank (YC), and other biographical notes.

Timeline

1977–present

See also
 Admiral (United States)
 List of active duty United States three-star officers
 List of United States Public Health Service Commissioned Corps four-star admirals
 List of United States military leaders by rank

References

Notes

Bibliography
 
 
 Reports of the Surgeon General from the National Library of Medicine's "Profiles in Science"

Lists of admirals
Three-star officers